Kabanga is a ward in the Ngara District of the Kagera Region in Tanzania near the Burundian border. Wahagaza are the indigenous of Ngara. In 2016 the Tanzania National Bureau of Statistics report there were 24,979 people in the ward, from 22,010 in 2012.

Villages 
The ward has 25 villages.

 Mukafigiri
 Mukitangaro
 Mkisagara
 Muntamba
 Ibuga Na. 1
 Ibuga Centre
 Mukihahe
 Kichacha A
 Kichacha B
 Mukigoti
 Mndarangavye
 Djululigwa centre
 Murukoli
 Kabanga ya juu
 Kumushiha
 Nzaza A
 Nzaza B
 Mkagobero
 Murukukumbo chini
 Mundimanga
 Muchuya
 Mukitamo
 Murutete
 Mukirehe
 Murulango

Transport 

In 2021, a proposed railway to Rwanda would pass through this town.

See also 
 Kabanga Nickel Project

References

Populated places in Kagera Region